Al-Khawdh (الخوض) (25°35'N; 58°10'E, altitude 40–50 m) contains several archaeological sites and lies in the Muscat Governorate, Oman where Early Iron Age and Late Iron Age sites have been under study in recent years.

Major finds include a large cemetery of the Early Iron Age i.e. the Lizq-Rumaylah period. and a hoard of over 300 implements made of copper alloy  The above-mentioned cemetery lies 2500 m south-east of the hoard site.

See also
 Archaeology of Oman
 Oman
 Pre-Islamic recent period
List of archaeological sites by country

Sources
Paul Yule, Cross-roads – Early and Late Iron Age South-eastern Arabia, Abhandlungen Deutsche Orient-Gesellschaft, vol. 30, Wiesbaden, 2014, ; E-Book: .

References

History of Oman
Archaeological sites in Oman